Hilda Spong (14 May 1875 London – 16 May 1955 Ridgefield, Connecticut USA), was an English actress of stage and screen, appearing in Australia, Europe, and America. She was the daughter of Walter Brookes Spong and Elizabeth Twedle.

List of Productions

Filmography
A Star Over Night (1919)
Divorced (1915)

References

External links

 
 
 Hilda Spong photo gallery; New York Public Library Billy Rose coll.
  touring company "The Swan" 1924; Hilda Spong 3rd from left bottom row

1875 births
1955 deaths
English stage actresses
English film actresses
20th-century English actresses
British expatriate actresses in Australia
British expatriate actresses in the United States